Agladrillia plicatella is a species of sea snail, a marine gastropod mollusk in the family Drilliidae.

Description
The shell grows to a length of  7 mm, its diameter 2.5 mm.

(Original description) The very small, acute shell contains 8 whorls. It has a flesh color or is pinkish while and has a polished appearance. The protoconch is turbinate, blunt, polished, smooth and contains about  two whorls. The subsequent whorls are axially sculptured with (on the body whorl behind the node) ten sharp, more or less sigmoid, slightly protractive ribs extending from the suture to the siphonal canal, or on the spire from suture to suture, with wider interspaces. The suture is oppressed. In front of it is a very slight constriction corresponding to an anal fasciole, though no actual fasciole is visible. The aperture is moderate. The anal sulcus is large for the size of the shell, rounded and deep. The outer lip is rounded and produced. On the body a small mass of callus limits the posterior edge of the sulcus. The body is smooth and callous, the enamel extending upon the columella, which is short and attenuated. The siphonal canal is short, recurved, on the back finely, sharply, spirally striated, but these striae do not extend over the rotundity of the whorl.

Distribution
This marine species occurs in Panama Bay.

References

External links
 

plicatella
Gastropods described in 1908